Rodolphe Cuendet (1891 – 9 February 1954) was a Swiss ice hockey player who competed in the 1920 Summer Olympics.

In 1920, he participated with the Swiss ice hockey team in the Summer Olympics tournament.

See also
 List of Olympic men's ice hockey players for Switzerland

References

External links
 

1891 births
1954 deaths
Ice hockey players at the 1920 Summer Olympics
Olympic ice hockey players of Switzerland
Swiss ice hockey left wingers